Zelimkhan Khadjiev (born May 20, 1994 in Dagestan) is a Russian-French freestyle wrestler of Chechen heritage. He competed in the men's freestyle 74 kg event at the 2016 Summer Olympics, in which he was eliminated in the round of 16 by Sosuke Takatani.

References

External links
 

1994 births
Living people
French male sport wrestlers
Olympic wrestlers of France
Wrestlers at the 2016 Summer Olympics
European Wrestling Championships medalists